The Uganda Hockey Association is the governing body of field hockey in Uganda. It is affiliated to IHF International Hockey Federation and AHF African Hockey Federation. The headquarters of the Association are in Kampala, Uganda.

Philip Wafula Mulindo is the President of Uganda Hockey Association and Stanley Tamale is the General Secretary.

History

6th Men Field Hockey Africa Nations Cup
In 13 to 20 May 2000, the Uganda national team played the 6th Men's Hockey Africa Cup of Nations in Bulawayo, Zimbabwe, which classified the winner for the World Cup.

Participating countries were South Africa, Egypt, Zimbabwe, Ghana, Nigeria, Namibia, and Uganda. 16 Ugandan players took part in the competition; the trainer was the Italian international goalkeeper Damian Angió. The Ugandan team scored four times, and despite finishing last in the tournament, it was a victory in itself, because the national team was back after being absent for 27 years in official tournaments.

Grounds
Uganda hockey grounds .

See also
 Uganda men's national field hockey team
 Uganda women's national field hockey team
 African Hockey Federation

References

External links
Uganda-FIH

Uganda
Hockey
Field hockey in Uganda